Eucalyptus rhomboidea, commonly known as the diamond gum, is a species of mallet or tree that is endemic to the southwest of Western Australia. It has smooth bark, lance-shaped adult leaves, flower buds in groups of seven, pale yellow flowers and cup-shaped to funnel-shaped fruit that is glaucous at first.

Description
Eucalyptus rhomboidea is a mallet that typically grows to a height of  but does not form a lignotuber. It has smooth greyish to brownish bark that is shed in ribbons. Young plants have stems that are square in cross-section and egg-shaped to elliptical leaves that are sessile, glaucous and arranged in opposite pairs. Flowering occurs from September to October and the flowers are pale yellow. The fruit is a woody, cup-shaped to funnel-shaped capsule, glaucous at first and with the valves protruding strongly.

Taxonomy and naming
Eucalyptus rhomboidea was first formally described in 2007 by Stephen Hopper and Dean Nicolle in the journal Nuytsia from material collected by Nicolle in 1998. The specific epithet (rhomboidea) is from the Latin word rhombus meaning "diamond-shaped", referring to the distinctively shaped flower buds.

Distribution and habitat
Diamond gum is only known from level or slightly undulating country in the Bremer Range between Lake King and Norseman where it grows in low woodland or tall shrubland.

Conservation status
This eucalypt is classified as "Priority Four" by the Government of Western Australia Department of Parks and Wildlife, meaning that is rare or near threatened.

See also
List of Eucalyptus species

References

rhomboidea
Endemic flora of Western Australia
Mallees (habit)
Myrtales of Australia
Eucalypts of Western Australia
Vulnerable flora of Australia
Plants described in 2007
Taxa named by Stephen Hopper